The Lanchester Fourteen Roadrider is a six-cylinder automobile introduced by the Lanchester Motor Company in the beginning of September 1936. It was named "Roadrider" for its special suspension features, and billed as the lowest-priced six-cylinder Lanchester ever offered. This car replaced the previous 12 hp (tax horsepower) Light Six model with a larger six-cylinder (14 hp tax horsepower) engine again in the Lanchester Eleven chassis and body. 

The four-light four-door sports saloon was given a new "razor edge" body. The entirely new Roadrider shape, introduced within twelve months, was similar in appearance.

The Fourteen was continued after World War II, with a coachbuilt body for the home market and, under the Lanchester Leda name for the export market, with a lighter all-steel body.

Design and specifications

Chassis, engine, and transmission
These followed the customary Lanchester practice and the transmission included the Daimler fluid flywheel and the self-changing pre-selective four-speed gearbox. Final drive was by underslung worm gear.

Standard body
Magna type wire wheels and fully chromium-plated bumpers were standard. There was a new range of coachwork. Upholstery was provided in a new style either in all leather or a combination of leather and cloth. The windscreen had remote-motor dual wipers operating from the bottom.

Performance

Prices

 chassis £250
 fabric topped saloon £325
 panelled topped saloon £330
 sports saloon £340
 coupé £330

New Roadrider

A new Lanchester Roadrider "breaking fresh and important ground" was announced at the beginning of October 1937. Engine, chassis, and body were all different, and larger and independent front suspension was now provided. An optional manual syncromesh gearbox with an ordinary clutch was also available at reduced price. This car was a simpler, less luxurious version of the Daimler New Fifteen, sharing the two standard bodies but using a smaller engine.

Design and specifications (Mark II)
details in addition to tabled data

Engine (Mark II)
The crankshaft ran in four bearings The engine unit had bi-axial four-point rubber mountings.

"On the offside are the horizontal carburettor, the manifolds held by brass nuts, the air-cooled dynamo with a belt drive common to the combined fan and impeller and the steering box which has worm and double roller gear.

On the nearside the vertically driven make-and-break and distributor is placed centrally and has a neat easily detachable cover over the top which also hides the sparking plugs and wiring. Here also are the water tap, the coil, pressure oil filter, dip rod, sump drain plug, starter and mechanical fuel pump"

Transmission  (Mark II)
Power was transmitted to the rear wheels with the usual Daimler fluid flywheel and self-changing gearbox but the final drive was now by spiral bevel. A pin roller-bearing propeller-shaft led to a half-floating spiral bevel driven back axle.

Chassis  (Mark II)
Independent front wheel springing was provided in the form of parallel links with coil springs, radius arms and torsion bar damping.  The rear half-elliptical springs also were given a torsion bar stabilizer and hydraulic shock absorbers. They were rubber-mounted to minimise vibration. The exhaust system was also insulated. 

Steering was now by worm and double roller. 

Tyres 5.75 x 16 inches.

Bendix mechanical brakes were on all four wheels.

Standard body (Mark II)
The radiator case was carried well forward of the front axle which lengthened the bonnet and, with the sweeping lines of the body, gave a big car appearance. "Easy clean" wheels were fitted, the front seats were adjustable, and the steering wheel column was telescopic.

A luggage boot was added at the back with a separate lockable compartment for a spare wheel. Other additions were footrests for the back passengers, an electric cigarette lighter, a sunshine roof, double screen wipers, sun visors, and a new pistol-grip handbrake lever on the dash.

Performance (Mark II)
Lanchester estimated the fuel consumption to be 22 mpg. Maximum speed 70 mph.

Prices (Mark II)

 saloon £375
 sports saloon £375
either car might be had with four-speed syncromesh gearbox and friction clutch for £350

Post-war Fourteen and Leda

The new Lanchester Fourteen was displayed to the press on 9 October 1950, the day before the public announcement. The only familiar feature was the fluid flywheel and pre-selective gearbox. It was planned that, when the factory space destroyed in the Coventry raids was completed, the coachbuilt body would be replaced with an all-steel body which would reduce the car's weight, enable a price reduction, and permit shipment in a form suitable for assembly overseas. The Times regarded the new car's only features of technical interest to be the laminated leaves (usually bars) of the front suspension's springing and the automatic lubrication every time the car was started and warmed up. Aside from the front suspension, the new chassis differed little from its pre-war version. The engine was new, a 1968 cc four replacing the 1809 cc six.

Design and specifications (post-war)
details in addition to tabled data

Engine (post-war)
The engine was flexibly mounted to isolate torque reactions. It was fitted with a statically and dynamically balanced three bearing crankshaft; big ends fitted with steel-backed white-metal liners; three bearing camshaft with steel-backed white-metal liners; air silencer; and automatic advance and vacuum control of the distributor with over-riding hand adjustment for varying grades of fuel.

Transmission (post-war)
The usual Daimler transmission with fluid flywheel and pre-selective 4-speed epicyclic gearbox was provided. Hardy Spicer open propeller shaft with needle roller universal joint and hypoid bevel rear axle linked the engine and rear wheels.

Chassis (post-war)
The frame was of box section and cruciform braced. Suspension was independent in front using laminated torsion bars with a torsional stabilising bar. At the rear there were half-elliptic springs. Girling hydraulic shock absorbers and Girling hydro-mechanical brakes were fitted.

Disc type bolt-on wheels were fitted with 6.7" x 15" low pressure cushion tyres.

Standard body (post-war)
The post-war Fourteen had an entirely new coachbuilt body. When supplied for export with the lighter all-steel body, the car was known as the Lanchester Leda.

Price (post-war)
Standard coachbuilt 4-door six-light body £895

References

External links

Images otherwise unavailable
 Razor-edge Roadrider
 1939 Lanchester Fourteen Roadrider 6-light saloon de luxe

14
Cars introduced in 1936
1940s cars
1950s cars
Sedans
Rear-wheel-drive vehicles
Coupés